Satchell is a surname. Notable people with the surname include:

Elizabeth Satchell (1763–1841), English actress
Kevin Satchell (born 1988), English boxer
Paige Satchell (born 1998), New Zealand women's footballer
William Arthur Satchell (1861–1942), New Zealand horticulturalist and writer

See also
Satchel (disambiguation)